John James Campbell (born 10 February 1964) is a New Zealand journalist and radio and television personality. He is currently a presenter and reporter at TVNZ; before that, he presented Checkpoint, Radio New Zealand's drive time show, from 2016 to 2018. For ten years prior to that (ending May 2015), he presented Campbell Live, a  current affairs programme on TV3. He was a rugby commentator for Sky Sports during the All Blacks' test against Samoa in early 2015 — a fixture he had vocally campaigned for while hosting Campbell Live.

Early and personal life
Campbell was born in 1964; his parents are Jim and Wendy Campbell. He graduated from Wellington College and then from Victoria University with a Bachelor of Arts degree with Honours in English Literature.

Campbell is married to documentary editor Emma Patterson. The couple have two children.

Broadcasting career
Campbell started broadcasting at Victoria University's Radio Active as a student where, as "Sparky Plug", he provided humorous "alternative rugby commentaries" during All Black games which he now describes as "unbelievably rude" and "grossly defamatory." He then worked as a share trader, providing a share report to Radio New Zealand's Midday Report. In 1989, Radio New Zealand (RNZ) offered him a job as a business reporter. He had no journalism training, but RNZ ran a cadetship system which provided him with the experience he needed. He read the three-minute news bulletins on the hour for RNZ, and then moved to TV3 in 1991 as a general reporter in their Wellington newsroom. He moved to their political press gallery a year later.

In 1994 he moved to the current affairs programme 20/20, and later presented an interview/current events segment of 3 News (now Newshub). After John Hawkesby left 3 News in 1998, Campbell was asked to fill in, and he remained as the main 3 News weekday newsreader along with Carol Hirschfeld until 2005. 

In 2002, Campbell was interviewing Prime Minister Helen Clark about the issue of genetically modified corn in New Zealand, dubbed 'Corngate'. The interview ended with Clark labelling Campbell a "sanctimonious little creep" due to what she considered the ambush style of the interview. The Broadcasting Standards Authority (BSA) later ruled that the infamous "Corngate" interview was unbalanced, unfair and lacked impartiality and objectivity.

Campbell and Hirschfeld started Campbell Live in March 2005. On 21 May 2015, TV3 announced that Campbell Live would soon cease to air, and Campbell had decided to leave MediaWorks, despite having been offered a position co-hosting a replacement current affairs programme. Only one year of the offered three-year extension was to have been presenting Campbell Live, and the network was insisting the programme become more entertainment-driven and reduce its concentration on core Campbell Live subjects, such as Christchurch after the earthquakes, child poverty, Pike River, etc. The final programme aired on 29 May 2015.

Campbell and Carol Hirschfeld made two series of the interview programme Home Truths, and in 2004 they made a 12-part series touring New Zealand called A Queen's Tour, following the route of Queen Elizabeth's visit in 1953–1954. Campbell also hosted the Saturday Morning programme on Radio New Zealand for two years, from 2000 to 2002.

Campbell appeared in the sixth series of the successful New Zealand TV series Outrageous Fortune and frequently appeared in the animated series bro'Town.

Campbell took over as host of the Radio New Zealand current affairs programme Checkpoint in January 2016. His final appearance for Checkpoint was broadcast on 14 September 2018. He subsequently moved to TVNZ, becoming a roving reporter across the company's news and current affairs output, as well as an occasional fill-in presenter on 1 News.
Campbell made a cameo appearance in the 2016 New Zealand film Hunt for the Wilderpeople.

In April 2019, he joined Breakfast replacing Jack Tame who moved to Q+A. In 2021 Campbell hosted a 1 News special Anger, Anxiety & Us which investigated increasing division in New Zealand society.

In April 2022 he announced he was finishing up with Breakfast  to take up the new role of TVNZ chief correspondent.

Awards
Campbell has twice won the Qantas Media Award for Best Investigative Current Affairs and for Best Presenter, as well as winning the Best Presenter category twice for the New Zealand Film and Television Awards.

Campbell won the Best Current Affairs Presenter category in the TV Guide "Best on the Box" Awards in 2010, 2011, 2012, 2014 and 2015.

In 2013, Campbell was named a Distinguished Alumnus of Victoria University.

Campbell was named Presenter of the Year 2017 in the Association for International Broadcasting's 13th annual global awards. And in the 2017 New York Festivals World's Best Radio Programs Awards, Campbell won a Bronze Award in the category of Best News Anchor/Reporter.

In 2019, while filming a story in Samoa, with Producer Adrian Stevanon, for TVNZ's Sunday programme, Campbell was awarded the chiefly title Toleafoa by Samoan Head of State, Tuimalealiifano Vaaletoa Sualauvi II.

See also
 List of New Zealand television personalities

References

External links
Campbell Live on 3 News
Campbell Live Full Episodes On Demand

Tearaway Magazine interview
Salient Article 2003

1964 births
People educated at Wellington College (New Zealand)
Living people
New Zealand radio presenters
New Zealand television newsreaders and news presenters
People from Wellington City
Victoria University of Wellington alumni
RNZ National
New Zealand investigative journalists
New Zealand radio journalists